3425 Hurukawa, provisional designation , is a stony Eoan asteroid from the outer region of the asteroid belt, approximately 25 kilometers in diameter. It was discovered by German astronomer Karl Reinmuth at Heidelberg Observatory on 29 January 1929, and named after Japanese astronomer Kiichirō Furukawa.

Orbit and classification 

Hurukawa is a member of the Eos family, the largest asteroid family in the outer main belt consisting of nearly 10,000 asteroids.. It orbits the Sun at a distance of 2.7–3.3 AU once every 5 years and 2 months (1,898 days). Its orbit has an eccentricity of 0.08 and an inclination of 9° with respect to the ecliptic. In 1903, a first precovery was taken at the discovering observatory, extending the asteroid's observation arc by 26 years prior to its official discovery.

Physical characteristics 

Hurukawa has been characterized as a common S-type asteroid.

Rotation period 

In September 2005, a rotational lightcurve of Hurukawa was obtained from photometric observations by French astronomer Raymond Poncy. It gave a well-defined, slightly longer-than-average rotation period of  hours with a brightness variation of 0.47 in magnitude. The period was confirmed by observations taken at the U.S. Palomar Transient Factory in August 2010, which rendered a period of  hours and an amplitude of 0.17, superseding a third period of 16 hours from a fragmentary lightcurve obtained by French astronomer René Roy in 2007.

Diameter and albedo 

According to the surveys carried out by the Infrared Astronomical Satellite IRAS, the Japanese Akari satellite, and NASA's Wide-field Infrared Survey Explorer with its subsequent NEOWISE mission, Hurukawa measures between 21.3 and 27.8 kilometers in diameter and its surface has an untypically low albedo between 0.10 and 0.17. The Collaborative Asteroid Lightcurve Link derives an albedo of 0.11 and a diameter of 25.3 kilometers.

Naming 

This minor planet was named in honor of Japanese Kiichirō Furukawa (1929–2016), who was an astronomer at Tokyo Astronomical Observatory and an observer and discoverer of minor planets himself. The official naming citation was published by the Minor Planet Center on 16 December 1986.

References

External links 
 Asteroid Lightcurve Database (LCDB), query form (info )
 Dictionary of Minor Planet Names, Google books
 Asteroids and comets rotation curves, CdR – Observatoire de Genève, Raoul Behrend
 Discovery Circumstances: Numbered Minor Planets (1)-(5000) – Minor Planet Center
 
 

003425
Discoveries by Karl Wilhelm Reinmuth
Named minor planets
19290129